Lambeth is a place in the London Borough of Lambeth.

Lambeth may also refer to:

 Lambeth, Middlesex County, Ontario, Canada
 Lambeth, Oxford County, Ontario, Canada
 Lambeth (UK Parliament constituency), a parliamentary constituency centred on the Lambeth district of South London
 London Borough of Lambeth, a London borough in South London, England
 Metropolitan Borough of Lambeth, a metropolitan borough under London County Council from 1900 to 1965
 Lambeth Bridge, across the River Thames in London
 Lambeth Conference, decennial assemblies of bishops of the Anglican Communion
 Lambeth Palace, the official London residence of the Archbishop of Canterbury

People with the surname
 J. Walter Lambeth (1896-1961), American politician
 Jonathan Lambeth (born 20th century), former British actor
 W. A. Lambeth (1867–1944), American professor